Polygrammodes ponderalis is a moth in the family Crambidae. It was described by Achille Guenée in 1854. It is found in Brazil, Colombia and Peru.

References

Spilomelinae
Moths described in 1854
Moths of South America